Basildon Athletics Club caters for athletes of 8 years and older, and aims to provide an athletic education and competitive opportunities to budding athletes in Basildon and surrounding area. Although inclusive and welcoming, the club has a tradition of supporting athletes towards international honours.

Current Senior Internationals
 James Shane
 Gianni Frankis
 Kim Wall

Club Olympians
 Eamonn Martin
 Robert Denmark

Headquarters

Basildon Athletics Club's headquarters have been in Gloucester Park, Basildon (ENG), since the club's formation in 1955. Current training nights are Mondays and Wednesdays, although many training groups use the facilities at other times.
Athletes who are under 17 years of age compete in the Eastern Young Athletes League Premier Division and National Young Athlete League. Athletes who are under 20 years of age compete in the National Junior League as Basildon Beagles (a joint team with Newham and Essex Beagles).

Club colours

The club vest is bright yellow with fine royal blue vertical stripes. Shorts are royal blue.

References

External links 
 Basildon AC
 

Borough of Basildon